Nesiocina is a genus of land snails with an operculum. It is a genus of terrestrial gastropod mollusks in the subfamily Helicininae of the family Helicinidae.

Species
 Palaeohelicina congener (E. A. Smith, 1889)
 Palaeohelicina egregia (L. Pfeiffer, 1855)
 Palaeohelicina filiae A. J. Wagner, 1905
 Palaeohelicina fischeriana (Montrouzier, 1863)
 Palaeohelicina heterochroa A. J. Wagner, 1905
 Palaeohelicina insularum (Hedley, 1891)
 Palaeohelicina livida (Hombron & Jacquinot, 1848)
 Palaeohelicina louisiadensis (Forbes, 1851)
 Palaeohelicina mayri Clench, 1958
 Palaeohelicina novoguineensis (E. A. Smith, 1887)
 Palaeohelicina novopommerana I. Rensch, 1937
 Palaeohelicina rabei (Pilsbry, 1897)
 Palaeohelicina spinifera (L. Pfeiffer, 1855)
 Palaeohelicina stanleyi (Forbes, 1851)
 Palaeohelicina viperina I. Rensch & B. Rensch, 1935
 Palaeohelicina vocator Iredale, 1941
 Palaeohelicina woodlarkensis (E. A. Smith, 1891)
Species brought into synonymy
 Palaeohelicina moquiniana (Récluz, 1851): synonym of Palaeohelicina livida (Hombron & Jacquinot, 1848) (junior synonym)

References

Vol. III. Trochomorphidae and systematical review of all other families. Ancona: L'Informatore Piceno. 160 pp
 Bank, R. A. (2017). Classification of the Recent terrestrial Gastropoda of the World. Last update: July 16th, 2017.

External links

 Wagner, A. J. (1905). Helicinenstudien. Denkschriften der kaiserlichen Akademie der Wissenschaften, mathematisch-naturwissenschaftliche Klasse. 77: 357-450, pls. I-IX, Wien

Helicinidae
Gastropod genera